Youds is an English surname originally from the Wirral peninsula, historically part of Cheshire.

The name must not be confused with the similar-sounding Youd surname.

The earliest record dates from 1434 and in 1588 the name appears in Bebington, Wirral.

Origin of the name

Currently little is known about the meaning or origin of this unusual and rare surname, it is not listed in any books of British surnames. Viking roots are a likely possibility as the Wirral peninsula was colonised by Norwegian Vikings from 902 AD onwards.

Early records

The first recorded spelling of the family name is shown to be John Euddes in 1434, an English soldier stationed in Vire garrison in Normandy. He is listed as a man-at-arms on a muster roll from the Hundred Years' War with France.

The surname next appears in 1588 recording the marriage of Richardus Yoldes & Margareta Collye in St Andrew's Church, Bebington.
 
Church records there start in 1558.

For the next 180 years the Youds name is only found on the Wirral, in villages such as Bidston, Greasby, Hoose, West Kirby etc. Around 1770 the name starts to appear also in Liverpool.

Many variants of the surname were recorded in the 16th and 17th century, including Yewds, Yewdes, Yuedes, Yeuds, Yeudes, Yowds, Yauds, Eudes, Euddes, Eaudes, Ewds, Ewdes, Ewdds, Youlds, Yoldes, Hewds, and others.

Today only the variant Youds is still in use.

Distribution of the name

According to the Office for National Statistics some 445 people named Youds lived in England & Wales in 2002.

The Youds surname has spread to other parts of the British Isles and through emigration also to USA, Canada, Australia and Brazil.

Key emigrants of interest to family historians are:

John Youds (born bef 1804): before 1824 to Bahia, Brazil
Thomas Youds (born 1855, Rainford): before 1880 to Australia
Charles John Youds (born 1875, Chorlton): 1929 to British Columbia
William Henry Youds (born 1881, Toxteth): 1907 to Vancouver
James Arthur Youds (born 1881, West Derby): 1912 to British Columbia
Henry Youds (born 1886, Bootle): 1894 to New York
Wilfred Nielsen Youds (born 1891, Kirkdale): 1894 to New York
Cyril Keith Wynne Youds (born 1924, Liverpool): bef 1954 to California

People with the surname Youds

George Youds (1872-1937), early English football player
Jack Youds (1878-1939), English golf professional, golf club maker
Robert Youds (1954-), Canadian sculptor
Eddie Youds (1970-),  English football player, retired
Katie Youds Smith (1988-), English author and vegetarian activist
Ben Youds (1988-), American ice hockey player

References

 YOUD and YOUDS worldwide 
 The Soldier in Later Medieval England 
 Surnames of England & Wales in 2002, ONS data  

Surnames